Karanjeet Singh, also known as Vyas Singh is an Indian politician who was elected as a Member of the Legislative Assembly for Daraunda (Vidhan Sabha constituency) in 2019 as an independent candidate & in 2020 on a BJP ticket.

References 

Bihar MLAs 2020–2025
Living people
1974 births
Bharatiya Janata Party politicians from Bihar